CONCACAF Girls' Under-15 Championship is a CONCACAF football competition.

The competition took place for the first time in 2014, with subsequent tournaments being held every two years.

Results

Awards

Golden Boot

Golden Ball

Golden Glove

CONCACAF Fair Play Award

References

External links
Under 15s – Girls, CONCACAF.com

Under-15 association football
Under-15, Girls
Recurring sporting events established in 2014